Switzerland competed at the 2000 Summer Olympics in Sydney, Australia. 102 competitors, 64 men and 38 women, took part in 82 events in 19 sports.

Medalists

Athletics

Men's competition
Men's 800m
 Andre Bucher
 Round 1 – 01:46.51
 Semifinal – 01:44.38
 Final – 01:45.40 (5th place)

Men's 110m Hurdles
 Paolo Della Santa
 Round 1 – 14.12 (did not advance)

 Raphael Monachon
 Round 1 – 14.8 (did not advance)

Men's 4 × 400 m
 Nicolas Baeriswyl, Andre Bucher, Laurent Clerc, Alain Rohr
 Round 1 – 03:06.01 (did not advance)

Men's 3,000m Steeplechase
 Christian Belz
 Round 1 – 08:33.45 (did not advance)

Men's Marathon
 Viktor Roethlin
 Final – 2:20:06 (36th place)

Men's Decathlon
 Philipp Huber
 100m – 11.35
 Long Jump – DNS
 Shot Put – DNS

Women's competition
Women's 100m
 Mireille Donders
 Round 1 – 11.63 (did not advance)

Women's 200m
 Mireille Donders
 Round 1 – 23.44 (did not advance)

Women's 1,500m
 Anita Wyermann
 Round 1 – 04:09.28
 Semifinal – 04:30.80 (did not advance)

 Sabine Fischer
 Round 1 – 04:10.78
 Semifinal – 04:06.67
 Final – 04:08.84 (9th place)

Women's Marathon
 Daria Nauer
 Final – 2:43:00 (38th place)

Beach volleyball

Martin Laciga and Paul Laciga – 5th place (tied)

Canoeing

Flatwater

Men's competition
Men's Kayak Singles 500m
 Adrian Hermann Bachmann
 Qualifying Heat – 01:45.187 (did not advance)

Men's Kayak Singles 1000m
 Adrian Hermann Bachmann
 Qualifying Heat – 03:45.705
 Semifinal – 03:47.479 (did not advance)

Slalom

Men's competition
Men's Kayak Singles
 Mathias Roethenmund
 Qualifying – 253.02
 Final – 227.96 (9th place)

Women's competition
Women's Kayak Singles
 Sandra Friedli
 Qualifying – 306.01
 Final – 262.30 (9th place)

Cycling

Cross Country Mountain Bike
Men's Cross Country Mountain Bike
 Christoph Sauser
 Final – 2:11:21.00 (Bronze medal)

 Thomas Frischknecht
 Final – 2:12:42.49 (6th place)

 Thomas Hochstrasser
 Final – DNF

Women's Mountain Bike
 Barbara Blatter
 Final – 1:49:51.42 (Silver medal)

 Chantal Daucourt
 Final – 1:56:49.53 (11th place)

Road Cycling

Men's competition
Men's Individual Time Trial
 Alex Zülle
 Final – 1:02:34 (33rd place)

Men's Road Race
 Markus Zberg
 Final – 5:30:46 (21st place)

 Oscar Camenzind
 Final – 5:30:46 (37th place)

 Mauro Gianetti
 Final – 5:30:46 (54th place)

 Laurent Dufaux
 Final – 5:30:46 (64th place)

 Alex Zülle
 Final – 5:30:46 (68th place)

Women's competition
Women's Individual Time Trial
 Nicole Brändli
 Final – 0:45:51 (23rd place)

Women's Road Race
 Yvonne Schnorf
 Final – 3:06:31 (9th place)

 Nicole Brändli
 Final – 3:06:31 (16th place)

 Priska Doppmann
 Final – 3:10:17 (32nd place)

Track Cycling

Men's competition
Men's Individual Pursuit
Franco Marvulli
Qualifying – 04:34.000 (did not advance)

Men's Point Race
Bruno Risi
Points – 13
Laps Down – 2 (12th place)

Men's Madison
Bruno Risi, Kurt Betschart
Final – 5 (11th place)

Diving

Men's 3 Metre Springboard
 Jean-Romain Delaloye
 Preliminary – 292.68 (45th place, did not advance)

Women's 3 Metre Springboard
 Catherine Maliev-Aviolat
 Preliminary – 204.06 (38th place, did not advance)

Women's Synchronized 3 Metre Springboard
 Catherine Maliev-Aviolat, Jacquiline Schneider
 Final – 256.2 (8th place)

Equestrianism

Fencing

Five fencers, two men and three women, represented Switzerland in 2000.

Men's épée
 Marcel Fischer

Men's sabre
 Laurent Waller

Women's épée
 Gianna Hablützel-Bürki
 Diana Romagnoli
 Sophie Lamon

Women's team épée
 Gianna Hablützel-Bürki, Sophie Lamon, Diana Romagnoli

Gymnastics

Judo

Modern pentathlon

Rowing

Sailing

Switzerland had four top 20 finishes during the Sailing competition at the 2000 Sydney Olympics.

Men's Single Handed Dinghy (Finn)
 Peter Theurer
 Race 1 – 16 
 Race 2 – 13 
 Race 3 – (21)
 Race 4 – 4 
 Race 5 – 18 
 Race 6 – 19 
 Race 7 – 8 
 Race 8 – 20 
 Race 9 – (26) DNC 
 Race 10 – 4 
 Race 11 – 18 
 Final – 120 (18th place)

Men's Double Handed Dinghy (470)
 Lukas Erni and Simon Bruegger
 Race 1 – (30) OCS
 Race 2 – (28)
 Race 3 – 27 
 Race 4 – 24 
 Race 5 – 20 
 Race 6 – 7 
 Race 7 – 20 
 Race 8 – 26 
 Race 9 – 27 
 Race 10 – 8 
 Race 11 – 25 
 Final – 184 (27th place)

Women's Mistral
 Anja Kaeser
 Race 1 – 14 
 Race 2 – (16)
 Race 3 – 7 
 Race 4 – 7 
 Race 5 – 10 
 Race 6 – 12 
 Race 7 – 13 
 Race 8 – 10 
 Race 9 – 13 
 Race 10 – (18)
 Race 11 – 4 
 Final – 90 (12th place)

Open Two Handed Keelboat (Star)
 Flabio Marazzi and Renato Marazzi
 Race 2 – 14 
 Race 3 – 4 
 Race 4 – (17) DSQ
 Race 5 – (17) DSQ
 Race 6 – (17) DNF
 Race 7 – 16 
 Race 8 – 12 
 Race 9 – 6 
 Race 10 – 10 
 Race 11 – 5 
 Final – 97 (15th place)

Open High Performance Two Handed Dinghy (49er)
 Thomas Rueegge and Claude Maurer
 Race 1 – 15 
 Race 2 – 6 
 Race 3 – 14 
 Race 4 – 4 
 Race 5 – 10 
 Race 6 – (17)
 Race 7 – 8 
 Race 8 – 9 
 Race 9 – (17)
 Race 10 – 14 
 Race 11 – 11 
 Race 12 – 15 
 Race 13 – 9 
 Race 14 – 13 
 Race 15 – 12 
 Race 16 – 11 
 Final – 151 (15th place)

Shooting

Swimming

Men's 50m Freestyle
 Christophe Bühler
 Preliminary Heat – 23.15 (→ did not advance)

Men's 100m Freestyle
 Karel Novy
 Preliminary Heat – 50.19 (→ did not advance)

Men's 100m Butterfly
 Philippe Meyer
 Preliminary Heat – 54.85 (→ did not advance)

Men's 100m Breaststroke
 Remo Lütolf
 Preliminary Heat – 01:02.54
 Final – 01:01.88 (→ 8th place)

Men's 100m Backstroke
 Philipp Gilgen
 Preliminary Heat – 57.5 (→ did not advance)

Men's 200m Individual Medley
 Yves Platel
 Preliminary Heat – 02:05.19 (→ did not advance)

Men's 400m Individual Medley
 Yves Platel
 Preliminary Heat – 04:22.38 (→ did not advance)

Men's 4 × 100 m Medley Relay
 Phillipp Gilgen, Remo Lütolf, Phillippe Meyer, and Karel Novy
 Preliminary Heat – 03:42.78 (→ did not advance)

Women's 400m Freestyle
 Flavia Rigamonti
 Preliminary Heat – 04:11.77 (→ did not advance)

 Chantal Strasser
 Preliminary Heat – 04:16.17 (→ did not advance)

Women's 800m Freestyle
 Flavia Rigamonti
 Preliminary Heat – 08:30.44
 Final – 08:25.91 (→ 4th place)

 Chantal Strasser
 Preliminary Heat – 08:35.84 (→ did not advance)

Women's 100m Breaststroke
 Agata Czaplicki
 Preliminary Heat – 01:13.19 (→ did not advance)

Women's 200m Breaststroke
 Agata Czaplicki
 Preliminary Heat – 02:32.98 (→ did not advance)

Synchronized swimming

Duet
 Madeleine Perk, Belinda Schmid
 Technical Routine – 32.153
 Free Routine – 59.886
 Final – 92.039 (10th place)

Tennis

Men's Singles competition:
 Roger Federer

Trampolining

Triathlon

At the inaugural Olympic triathlon competition, Switzerland was represented by three men and three women.  The women captured both the gold medal and the bronze medal, while the men added one more top eight finish.

Men's Competition:
 Reto Hug – 1:49:21.30 (→ 8th place)
 Markus Keller – 1:50:15.25 (→ 18th place)
 Jean-Christophe Guinchard – 1:50:50.76 (→ 24th place)

Women's Competition:
 Brigitte McMahon – 2:00:40.52 (→  Gold Medal)
 Magali Messmer – 2:01:08.83 (→  Bronze Medal)
 Sibylle Matter – 2:13:25.38 (→ 36th place)

Wrestling

Notes

Wallechinsky, David (2004). The Complete Book of the Summer Olympics (Athens 2004 Edition). Toronto, Canada. . 
International Olympic Committee (2001). The Results. Retrieved 12 November 2005.
Sydney Organising Committee for the Olympic Games (2001). Official Report of the XXVII Olympiad Volume 1: Preparing for the Games. Retrieved 20 November 2005.
Sydney Organising Committee for the Olympic Games (2001). Official Report of the XXVII Olympiad Volume 2: Celebrating the Games. Retrieved 20 November 2005.
Sydney Organising Committee for the Olympic Games (2001). The Results. Retrieved 20 November 2005.
International Olympic Committee Web Site

References

Nations at the 2000 Summer Olympics
2000
Summer Olympics